Gymnopilus fulvicolor is a species of mushroom in the family Hymenogastraceae.

Description

Habitat and distribution
Gymnopilus fulvicolor grows on leaf-mold, among sticks, under pine trees. In North America, it has been collected in Florida, in January.

See also

List of Gymnopilus species

References

External links
Gymnopilus fulvicolor at Index Fungorum

fulvicolor
Fungi of North America
Taxa named by William Alphonso Murrill